Matúš Ružinský (born 15 January 1992) is a Slovak football goalkeeper who plays for Slovan Bratislava.

Club career
He made his professional debut for Košice against AS Trenčín on 13 April 2013.

Honours
ŠKF Sereď
2. Liga: 2017–18

Slovan Bratislava
Fortuna Liga: 2021–22

References

External links
MFK Košice profile
Corgoň Liga profile

1992 births
Living people
Sportspeople from Banská Bystrica
Slovak footballers
Association football goalkeepers
FC VSS Košice players
ŠKF Sereď players
ŠK Slovan Bratislava players
FC ŠTK 1914 Šamorín players
Slovak Super Liga players
2. Liga (Slovakia) players